Basiru King (born 3 March 1971) is a Sierra Leonean footballer. He played in two matches for the Sierra Leone national football team in 1994 to 1995. He was also named in Sierra Leone's squad for the 1994 African Cup of Nations tournament.

References

1971 births
Living people
Sierra Leonean footballers
Sierra Leone international footballers
1994 African Cup of Nations players
Place of birth missing (living people)
Association football defenders